The South African Mint is responsible for minting all coins of the South African rand on behalf of its owner the South African Reserve Bank. Located in Centurion, Gauteng near South Africa's administrative capital Pretoria, the mint manufactures coins and planchets for both domestic and international markets.

History 
Following the discovery of gold in the South African Republic (causing the 1886 Witwatersrand Gold Rush), the country's President Paul Kruger decided to establish a national mint. This was established in 1890 and opened on 6 July 1892 in Pretoria. After the end of the Second Boer War in 1902, the country was annexed into the British Empire and became the Transvaal Colony, leading to the closure of the mint after the pound sterling became the legal tender of the new colony. Under the Mint Act of 1919, the British established a branch of the Royal Mint on 1 January 1923, which produced £83,114,575 worth of sovereigns during its lifetime. As South Africa began cutting ties with Britain, the mint closed on 30 June 1941 only to be later reopened as the South African Mint.

Products
Most of the production is of circulation coins and commemorative coins. Among them are:
Coins of the South African rand
 Bronze plated steel
 Nickel-plated bronzes
 Sterling silver (925Ag), e.g. EWT Medallions / Sterling Silver Crown
 22 ct Gold
 24 ct Gold (999.9Au)
 Zimbabwean Bond Coins
 South Sudanese pound coins denominated in 10, 20 and 50 piasters

See also

Bullion
Bullion coin
Economy of South Africa
Gold as an investment
Inflation hedge
Platinum as an investment
Silver as an investment

References

External links

official website

Mints (currency)
Finance in South Africa
Manufacturing companies based in the City of Tshwane
Gold coins
Year of establishment missing